The 1934 Catholic University Cardinals football team was an American football team that represented the Catholic University of America as an independent during the 1934 college football season. In its fourth year under head coach Dutch Bergman, the team compiled a 4–3–1 record and outscored opponents by a total of 194 to 39.

Schedule

References

Catholic University
Catholic University Cardinals football seasons
Catholic University Cardinals football